P.I. sometimes referred to as Private Investigator is a Singaporean crime/thriller drama starring Carl Ng, Vanessa Vanderstraaten, Karylle, Kathiravan Kandavelu, Joyce Ng, Najib Soiman and Shane Mardjuki.

The series premiered on MediaCorp TV Channel 5 on January 9, 2017.

Plot

Cast

Main Cast
 Carl Ng as Donny Lai
 Vanessa Vanderstraaten as Christine Yeoh-Ong
 Karylle as Maia Yap
 Kathiravan as Mozzie
 Najib Soiman as Bruno
 Joyce Ng as Rabbit Warrior

Supporting Cast
 Shane Mardjuki as Sam Ong 
 Kaidon Lee Jinyan as Josh
 Silvarajoo as Captain Aru
 Atyy Malek as Hannah
 Taufio Saleh as Insp. Amin 
 Audrey Lim as Cpl. Sharon 
 Doreen Choo as Lizzy
 Soraya Buchanan as Mrs Olivero 
 Jed Senthul as Mr. Raja

Special Guest  
 Terence Tay as Wilson
 Robin Leong as Pedro
 Isaac Chua as Michael
 Adele Wong as Cheryl C
 Derrick Ee as Ah Seng

Episodes

References

Singaporean television series